Warcry (born Priya Reddy) is an Indian-American environmentalist and anarchist activist, filmmaker, writer and political organizer.

Life and work 

As a child, Warcry emigrated with her parents from India to the United States. She attended college in New York City, then Paris, and eventually in the Bay Area San Francisco State University, where she studied Cinema and International Relations and also first discovered the writings of the anarchist Emma Goldman which influenced her deeply.

Will, Luers and Earth First!

In May 1998 Warcry worked with Earth First! In an ancient forest defense campaign in Oregon to preserve and protect old-growth forests from loggers. She met and befriended activists Brad Will and Jeff Luers at a tree-sit protest. It was here she adopted her sobriquet, as a conscious response to hippie-like tree-sitters such as Julia Butterfly Hill. Initially grounded due to her inability to climb, Warcry spent three weeks living on a platform neighboring Will's, and went on to live and work with Will on a number of video and print projects. Warcry and Will both worked with the NYC Indymedia collective until May 2001. In 2000 Luers was arrested and convicted of burning three SUVs in a statement against global warming and in 2001 was sentenced to more than 22 years in prison. Warcry has become a supporter of Luers and considers his prison sentence to be excessive, along with the Eugene Human Rights Commission, and several others including Howard Zinn. Warcry gives an explanation of Luers' action in her essay "Burning To Breathe Free".

Media activism

Warcry is an advocate of "democratizing corporate controlled media" and has worked with MediaChannel.Org and other media watch dog and free speech advocacy groups to organize a democratic media movement in the U.S. She was involved with the indymedia project since its inception in Seattle during the anti-WTO riots in 1999. She has since worked as an investigative reporter, exposing the systematic torture at Abu Ghraib. Warcry has also worked as a documentary filmmaker covering topics ranging from climate change to human rights in Palestine to dissent and protest in the United States, including the direct action based radical environmental movement. Warcry has her own film production company, Warcry Cinema, and founded the first New York anarchist film festival in April 2007 in honor of slain comrade Brad Will, which featured a rough cut of Will's footage from Oaxaca, Mexico called The Revolution Next Door. Every year since, Warcry has organized the NYC Anarchist Film Festival as an educational political forum in conjunction with the NYC Anarchist Bookfair which she helped to co-found. Warcry has also been a radio producer with the Pacifica Network, producing shows on Women's rights movements in the Middle East. Warcry also covered the G8 protests in Scotland in 2005 and the riots at the 2005 European Social Forum in Athens, Greece. Warcry's essay, "My Family Wears Black" about anarchists in the anti-globalization movement appears in a book called Global Uprising: Confronting the Tyrannies of the 21st Century.

Protest organization

Warcry has organized protests against the WTO in Seattle in 1999, the International Monetary Fund and World Bank in Prague in 2000, the WEF (World Economic Forum) in New York City, and organized The InterGalactic Anarchist Convention in NYC, the first major anarchist gathering in NYC post-9.11. Warcry was also involved with the Quebec City Summit of the Americas in 2001, and the Republican National Convention in New York City in 2004. A radical feminist, Warcry has organized public support for secular movements for self-determination of Iraqi women, as co-founder of Solidarity with the Organization of Women's Freedom in Iraq which opposes a theocratic State. She has also organized, What Would Emma Do? - the Anarcho-Feminist Panel at the New York Anarchist Bookfair in April 2007 and was a member of the New York City Direct Action Network, May 2001. Warcry has explained property destruction and black bloc as protest tactic and phenomenon at demonstrations, commenting that "I don't think Seattle would be on the map if it weren't for the catalyzing level of rage that was made visible through property destruction". And, "The environmental activists I knew risking their personal safety were calling attention to climate change long before it became trendy to do so. We knew decades ago that human driven climate change is the ultimate weapon of mass destruction."

Media appearances
 Breaking the Spell (film) (1999)
 This Is What Democracy Looks Like (2000)

 "Keepers of the Flame", The Village Voice 2002
 Jeff "Free" Luers was Sentenced to 22 Years in Prison for Burning 3 SUVs Democracy Now!, July 17, 2003

References

Anti-corporate activists
Green anarchists
Year of birth missing (living people)
Living people
Indian emigrants to the United States
American anarchists
Indian anarchists
Radical feminists
American women writers of Indian descent